Simulation cockpits or simpits are environments designed to replicate a vehicle cockpit. Although many pits commonly designed around an aircraft cockpit, the term is equally valid for train, spacecraft or car projects.

'Simpit' is generally used to refer to amateur, home built, setups which are the focus of this article. For more information on commercial flight simulators please see Flight Simulator.

Aircraft simpits

By their very nature, aircraft cockpits tend to have complex controls, instrumentation, and radios not present in other types of simulation. Recreating these present specific additional challenges to anyone building a cockpit. Aircraft components are often expensive to purchase, and access to real aircraft cockpits is likely to be restricted due to security concerns, especially in the wake of the 9/11 attacks or if the builder has chosen a current military aircraft.

A way to avoid a lot of the pitfalls is to not replicate a specific aircraft, simply a class of aircraft. Thus creating a generic GA, airliner, or military cockpit, which while it will not have every button or switch of the real aircraft, will have all the key elements for simulation. The other end of the scale is to build an exact 1:1 replica of the real cockpit, using real panels or even a complete cockpit from the chosen plane. All cockpit builds will be somewhere between these two concepts, and even highly accurate replica pits will often make some concessions, if only due to limitations of the simulation software driving them.

For replica pits, the choice of aircraft will be key. With the growth of home cockpits, there are a number of companies who sell complete kits for common aircraft, and the details of current Airbus and Boeing aircraft panels are fairly easy to obtain. For older aircraft, museums or scrap yards can be valuable sources of information. However, while research will often locate a lot of information, sometimes it is a minor detail that is needed. For example, how wide the center pedestal is, how large it should be, or its relative placement in the pit. Where the information is not in the public domain, more subtle techniques have been developed to obtain the information. For example, pixel counting from a digital photo of the aircraft. By counting the pixels in an item of known size, for example, a standard cockpit instrument, a scale can be established. This can then be used to estimate the size of unknown elements in the panel. Accuracy will vary depending on the quality of the photo located, the angle the shot was taken from, etc. However, this can give a good guideline on dimensions in situations where there may be no other source of information.

The level of functionality will also vary within the 'pit'. Very realistic-looking pits may have nonfunctioning instruments, simply in place to complete the 'feel' of the cockpit. At the top end of realism would be individual real instruments, either modified from actual aircraft components or replicated. This approach provides the maximum immersion, but presents a dramatic increase in building complexity, with interface electronics needing to be fabricated and the associated software drivers needing to be written. A compromise between the two is to display the instruments on a monitor and mount this behind the panel. The simulated instruments can then be seen through the cutouts which can give a realistic effect, especially if the aircraft uses 'glass cockpit' displays in real life.

Many pit builders go through the process of building a basic, low-spec compromise pit first, just to give them a dedicated environment to practice their hobby. The lessons learned in this process can be put to good use if they later decide to build a high-spec compromise or replica pit, which requires a great deal of time, effort, and passion to complete.

General aviation

Home based simulators have been a common training aid for private pilots for many years. Recently, the increased power of home PCs and improvements in graphics and simulation technology has opened up further opportunities to use a PC as a training aid. In fact, it is now quite easy to achieve a very high-fidelity training experience in one's own living room using off-the-shelf commercial products. While early simulators allowed instrument approaches to be practiced, with photographic scenery add ins pilots can now practice visual flights and navigation. Rehearsing a flight in the PC, before performing it in the real world, making training sessions in the real aircraft more productive.

Recognizing this market, a number of suppliers provide ready-to-go desktop simulation products. Radio stacks, instruments, yokes, pedals, throttle quadrants, and seats are readily available from pilot shops. This allows a highly realistic GA cockpit to be put together in a matter of minutes. However an enthusiast is likely to extend well beyond the functional cockpit a trainee would require, adding in items to enhance the suspension of disbelief. Enclosures, projectors, even real aircraft components or nose sections are commonly incorporated in the drive to make the experience as 'real' as possible.

Commercial aviation

While general aviation pits are often put together for real pilots to train on, commercial aircraft pits are often purely for entertainment. Very few people who are not professional pilots ever have the opportunity to pilot a real airliner, but a realistic home simulator will provide a highly immersing experience.

Commercial airliner pits offer a greater challenge to builders as there are more systems to model such as the autopilot, CDU/FMS, engine management, etc. Even the throttle quadrant is a complex piece of engineering compared to the simply replicated push/pull throttle used in the GA Cessna. However, a number of commercial suppliers exist supplying replica panels, controls, even complete cockpits to the community. Where these or 'real' components are not available or are out of budget builders will often fabricate components at home out of wood or similar easily worked materials.

With most modern aircraft using "glass cockpit" displays it has become easier to create highly realistic panels. The displays on these panels can be driven by multi-head graphics cards, or networked PCs running dedicated software that can read from the simulator spreading the processing load. Interfaces for switches, knobs, and other elements needed can be purchased commercially or created by dismantling existing hardware such as keyboards or joysticks. Feedback from the PC to the panel, for example to light warning lamps or move a real instrument is more complex and normally completed through a commercial expansion board.

Military aviation
The third common genre for a simpit is the military pit. Like commercial pits, these sims are typically designed more for entertainment than training. Military-based pits are commonly based on a single aircraft, often the F-16, due to the availability of highly realistic simulation software (Falcon 4.0) of this aircraft.

Software 
One of the first software requirements for a simpit is a suitable flight simulator to provide the graphics, sound and instrument outputs for the pit. To date, the majority of civilian simpits are built around Microsoft Flight Simulator, and most military pits use Falcon 4.0 as a base, but as of 2013 the Digital Combat Simulator series has spurred interest for the A-10 as well.  X-Plane 11 is also a powerful software package, with strong support for multiple screens.

Voice communication (VoIP) software is commonly integrated into a simpit, as this allows real-time communication with other virtual pilots.

Other software may be custom written to control hardware aspects of the pit; e.g. an interpreter for an MFD or a custom listener to implement an AoA Indexer. In many cases the need for custom software can be removed by using control hardware with a comprehensive SDK or API, but frequently an off-the-shelf solution is not available for unique instruments and so citation software is needed.

See also 
 Gaming chair

References

Flight training